This list compiles the entirety of the parishes within the Roman Catholic Diocese of Salford, located in the north of England.

The list of parishes are each divided by their local authority.

Borough of Blackburn with Darwen

Borough of Bolton

Borough of Burnley

Borough of Bury

Borough of Calderdale

Borough of Hyndburn

City of Manchester

Borough of Oldham

Borough of Pendle

Borough of Ribble Valley

Borough of Rochdale

Borough of Rossendale

City of Salford

Borough of South Ribble

Borough of Stockport

Borough of Tameside

Borough of Trafford

Borough of Wigan

See also 
 List of churches in Greater Manchester

References 

Attribution

External links 
 Information and Statistics for all parishes in the Diocese 

Roman Catholic churches in Greater Manchester
Roman Catholic churches in Lancashire
Lists of churches in England